The Enxet are an indigenous people of about 17,000 living in the Gran Chaco region of western Paraguay. Originally hunter-gatherers, many are now forced to supplement their livelihood as laborers on the cattle ranches that have encroached upon their dwindling natural forest habitat. Nevertheless, the Enxet are still engaged in an ongoing conflict with the government and ranchers, who want to destroy what remains of the forest to open the land for massive settlement. Today, only a handful of Enxet are still able to maintain their traditional way of life, while the majority live in small settlements sponsored by various missionary organizations. The Enxet and Enlhet languages are still vigorous.

References

Ethnic groups in Paraguay
Indigenous peoples of the Gran Chaco
Indigenous peoples in Paraguay